"I'll Keep Holding On" is a song composed by Mickey Stevenson and Ivy Jo Hunter and recorded by Motown singing group The Marvelettes, who released the single on the Tamla imprint in 1965. Peaking at #34 on the Billboard Hot 100 (and #11 on the R&B charts), the single returned the group to the top forty after a year recording songs that performed below the top forty. This was among the first A-side singles that longtime Marvelettes member Wanda Young sung lead on. Before 1965, the majority of the leads in Marvelettes songs had belonged to original member Gladys Horton. The single features a woman determined to win the love of an unknowingly conquest telling him that she'll convince him to love her "until my will to resist is gone". Her Marvelettes band mates Gladys Horton and Katherine Anderson egg her on with her ad-libbing "oh yeah/sho' nuff" in the bridge leading up to the chorus. The single was covered by British mod-pop act, The Action in 1966. It then returned across the Atlantic in 1998 to be released on Mink Rat or Rabbit by the Detroit Cobras.

Cash Box described it as "a shufflin’ pop-blues tearjerker about a love-sick gal who contends that she’ll stick with her guy no matter what he does" and said that the song has "tremendous potential."

Credits
Lead vocals by Wanda Young
Background vocals by Gladys Horton, Katherine Anderson and The Andantes (Jackie Hicks, Marlene Barrow, Louvain Demps)
Instrumentation by The Funk Brothers
Drums by Benny Benjamin

References

1965 singles
The Marvelettes songs
Songs written by William "Mickey" Stevenson
Songs written by Ivy Jo Hunter
Tamla Records singles
1965 songs
1966 singles
Song recordings produced by Ivy Jo Hunter
Song recordings produced by William "Mickey" Stevenson